The Dewarists is a musical television series on MTV India. The series is part music documentary and part travelogue. The show casts musicians from various parts of the world, collaborating to create original music while travelling across India. The first season featured a total of ten episodes. It featured many musicians, including Imogen Heap, Vishal–Shekhar, Zeb and Haniya, Shantanu Moitra, Swanand Kirkire, Indian Ocean, Mohit Chauhan, Parikrama, Agnee, Shilpa Rao, Shri, Monica Dogra, Rajasthan Roots, Papon, Rabbi Shergill, Shubha Mudgal, Swarathma, MIDIval Punditz, Humble the Poet, Karsh Kale, Baiju Dharmajan, Njeralathu Harigovindan, Raghu Dixit and Rewben Mashangva.

The first season was directed by Vishwesh Krishnamoorthy, an ad filmmaker and frontman of the Mumbai Hardcore band, Scribe. The first five episodes also involved UK filmmakers, Fred and Nick. The show is hosted by actor-singer Monica Dogra. The Theme music of The Dewarists was given by Raghu Dixit.

In 2013, for the launch of a new season of The Dewarists, the creators of the program altered the format of the show to move away from music inspired journeys and expanded it to include collaborations between musicians and visual artists from India and around the world. Directed by independent film-maker, Srinivas Sunderrajan, the show was broadcast on MTV India in its new format that merges the visual arts with sound to create a multi-sensory experience. The show was also the first collaborative experience to be simulcast on television and on YouTube. Singer Monica Dogra returned as hostess, and also one of the collaborators on the season premiere of The Dewarists Season 3.

All seasons featured visual effects, motion graphics, color grading and title sequences by Mumbai-based studio Plexus, headed by its founder and director Vijesh Rajan.

The Origin The Dewarist is a property conceptualized by Wizcraft International Entertainment. The Dewarist is inspired by Tommy Dewars philosophy of "Some things are worth doing".

The Philosophy

Dewarists believe in passion and things worth doing. Their motto is Some Things Are Worth Doing. They cast musicians from different genres and different places. By the end of the journey, they record a song that will reflect each of their genres and also the sounds and culture of the places they originate from and travel to. The show aims to inspire audiences to follow their dreams and do what they believe in. The music program started in India in November 2010 with a digital series featuring international artists Dub FX and Susheela Raman. Collaborating with other artists and performing in new cities helped inspire this program.

In Season Three of the show, artists from other genres outside of music were included. The addition of visual art into the music-centered dynamic of the show offered viewers a refreshing perspective on the link between music and art. Also, the brand philosophy, encapsulated as LIVE TRUE, was the perfect platform to showcase the lives and works of inspiring artists. The result of their collaborations is seen in a striking music video at the end of each episode that encapsulates their creative journey together.

Music rights

The Dewarists is a platform for independent artists to share their beats, rhymes, and reasons, thereby inspiring others to live true to their passions. A decision was hence made for the rights for the musical collaboration to remain with the artists who worked on it, thus setting a precedent in the music industry.

Season One (2011)

Episode 1 - Minds Without Fear

This was filmed in Samode Palace and Jaipur in Rajasthan, where Imogen Heap and Vishal Dadlani recorded the song Minds Without Fear, which is inspired by Rabindranath Tagore's poem "Where the Mind is without Fear".

Episode 2 - Kya Khayaal Hai

This was filmed at the legendary Capitol theatre in Mumbai, where Shantanu Moitra, Swanand Kirkire and the Pakistani duo Zeb and Haniya teamed up and recorded the song Kya Khayaal Hai.

Episode 3 - Maaya

This was filmed in Delhi with Indian Ocean and Mohit Chauhan. The song Maaya was performed at venue called Garden of Five Senses in New Delhi.

Episode 4 - I Believe

This was filmed in Pune with Parikrama, Agnee and Shilpa Rao. The song I Believe was recorded at Shisha Café.

Episode 5 - Changing World

This was filmed in Jaisalmer with Shri, Monica Dogra and Rajasthan Roots. The song Changing World was recorded.

Episode 6 - Khule Da Rabb

This was filmed in Kaziranga. Assam worked with Papon and Rabbi Shergill to record the song Khule Da Rabb.

Episode 7 - Duur Kinara

This was filmed in Mysore, Shubha Mudgal. Swarathma recorded the song Duur Kinara.

Episode 8 - No I.D. Required

This was filmed in Goa, Monica Dogra. MIDIval Punditz and Sikh-Canadian Humble the Poet recorded the song No I.D. Required.

Episode 9 - Sacred Science

This was filmed in Angadipuram. Kerala, Karsh Kale, Baiju Dharmajan and Njeralathu Harigovindan recorded the song Sacred Science.

Episode 10 - Masti Ki Basti

This was filmed in Shillong, Meghalaya. Raghu Dixit and Rewben Mashangva, known as The King of Naga Folk Blues, recorded the song Masti Ki Basti.

Season Two (2012)

Episode 1 - Let Go

The episode features the emotive acoustics of British singer-songwriter Fin Greenall and the soulful voice of Shafqat Amanat Ali Khan from Pakistan. They experience Mumbai through the eyes of their hosts Salim-Sulaiman, the prolific Bollywood composer duo.

Episode 2 - Tom, Dick & Harry

This episode is on a powerful droll satire penned by the outspoken English rapper, teacher, poet and journalist, Akala, and the equally versatile Piyush Mishra. This episode is shot in the Andaman and Nicobar islands.

Episode 3 - Today

This episode features Shaa'ir + Func and La Pongal. They create a high octane folktronica. This episode was shot in Chennai.

Episode 4 - Make Love
This episode features Thermal and a Quarter, Adil & Vasundhara, with their bluesy rhythms and Ashwin Srinivasan on flutes. This episode was shot at Bangalore.

Episode 5 - Gypsy

This episode features Anoushka Shankar on sitar, Sanjeev Shankar on shehnai, and Pirashanna Thevarajah on percussion. This episode was filmed in New Delhi.

Episode 6 - Altitude

This episode features the fusion band Advaita and Electronica artist Dualist Inquiry. This episode was shot in Shimla.

Episode 7 - Qutub Minar

The song tells a (fictional) story of a man who decides to relocate the monument of Qutub Minar from Delhi to Imphal. It features singer and songwriter Akhu, who collaborates with the Asian Dub Foundation.

Episode 8 - Bangla Bass

In this episode, American rapper Brooklyn Shanti and Indian actor-musician Mou Sultana create a track with DJ Nucleya about the city Kolkata.

Episode 9 - Maati

In this episode, award-winning percussionist Trilok Gurtu teams up with electronic folk duo Hari + Sukhmani in their hometown of Chandigarh. Maati is an ambient folk song that is set to the poetry of 18th century Sufi poet Bulleh Shah. The song has been given a range of sounds thanks to the percussive genius of Trilok Gurtu.

Episode 10 - The Minstrel's Tale

Papon and Karsh Kale, from Season 1, come together with Carl Barat (from The Libertines and Dirty Pretty Things) for the season's finale. This is the first Dewarists episode shot outside India, in Aberfeldy, Scotland. It also features a trip to the Dewars distillery plant.

Season Three (2013)

Episode 1 - Suspended

This episode features Monica Dogra of indie rock outfit, Shaair+Func a photographer and light specialist, Eric Pare, and Prashant Mistry of one of UK's electro bass outfits, Engine-EarZ Experiment. This is the first episode of the new season of The Dewarists and explores the theme of duality. Set in the snow-capped hills of Manali, the music video, Suspended, was a stirring amalgamation of light painting and electronic music.

Episode 2 - Khirama

The second episode of the third season enabled the coming together of indie-pop icon Lucky Ali and renowned installation artist, Shilpa Gupta. Toying with the idea of the loss of identity in a big city like Mumbai, Lucky Ali created the tune he wanted to go with, while Shilpa Gupta worked to write the lyrics. For the final music video, Khirama, Lucky and Shilpa used words as both lyric and art, ultimately giving a whole new meaning to the song produced.

Episode 3 - Aaina

Intrigued by the story behind the creation of the urban jungle that is Mumbai, our collaborators – hand shadowgrapher Amar Sen, and audio-visual collective B.L.O.T., decided to showcase the creations of the island city, ranging from its colonial past to the city of today. Their collaboration, Aaina, uses Amar Sen's shadow work and B.L.O.T.'s light projections to tell the story visually. Suryakant Sawhney, from Peter Car Recording Co., provides vocals to complement the visuals.

Episode 4 - Hadimba

The fertile, grassy slopes of Manali play host to the fourth collaboration of Season Three of The Dewarists. The collaborators are: Lagori, a highly energetic folk fusion band from Bengaluru, and Actor's Cult, a theatre group from Mumbai. The outcome of their collaboration is the high-octane song that inspires awe and fervor.

Episode 5 - Khwaamakhaah

Jayachandran Palazhy, founder of the Attakkalari Centre For Movement Arts, and his dance troupe are joined by Delhi-based hind-rock band Euphoria. Set by the tranquil shores of Pondicherry, the collaboration fuses contemporary movement arts with the effortless energy of Euphoria.

Episode 6 - The Journey

The sixth episode on The Dewarists this season looked back upon the collaborations where music and art met to create a multi-sensory experience. Monica Dogra accompanied viewers through the diverse locales where each artist worked to create art that inspired those around it.

Episode 7 - I

The one-hour-long season finale featured a collaboration between India's folk rock collective, The Raghu Dixit Project; a contemporary dance troupe, Nritarutya; mask maker, Sridhar Murthy; and graffiti artist and animator, Harun Robert. Set in Bangalore, the music video produced was a blend of diverse art forms, genres, mediums, and styles.

Season Four (2015)

Episode 1 - Yaad

‘Yaad’ the first episode of the fourth season of The Dewarists unfolds with a collaboration of American clarinetist and music composer Shankar Tucker, and gifted vocalist Nirali Kartik. Inspired by one of the subcontinent's greatest Urdu poets: Faiz – whose poetry still speaks to those hoping for love. They try to recreate the words of Faiz in a melodious tribute to both the poet and the poem ‘Kab Yaad Mein Tera'. The track reflects the individual styles of the artists, the mood of the mellifluous raga, and the mysteries of longing and separation.

Episode 2 - Fakiri

In the Second episode of Season Four, we see Vishal Dadlani Collaborating with Neeraj Arya’s Kabir Cafe to create the song ==Fakiri' which is neither betwixt nor between.but the song is inspired by both Kabir’s life, and his poem ‘Lago Mere Yaar Fakiri’, which is about letting go.

Episode 3 - Daiyya Ri

In the third episode of The Dewarists Season four, The Raghu Dixit Project and Bindhumalini, travel to Rajasthan.They find inspiration from a local poets’ community, Chang, from the Prince of Alsisar Mahal, and Abhimanyu Singh. This inspiration from the local poets and the surreal beauty of Alsisar Mahal leads our Dewarists to do magic with the colorful words of Amir Khusrow , in ‘Daiyya Ri’, a poem written to express his love of his pir.

Episode 4 - O Megh

Kashmir bears witness to the fourth collaboration of this season, where Shantanu Moitra and Papon create a song inspired by Rabindranath Tagore’s poem, ‘O Megh’ — a tribute to a child's imagination and his dilemma at leaving his mother behind while he's tempted to go and play with clouds and waves. In Kashmir, they meet local poets who introduce them to local traditions via Bhand Pather's performance. As our Dewarists jam together, the poem takes them back to the memories of the time they spent with their parents back home.

Episode 5 - Recap

From Shadowgraphy to installation art, The Dewarists has travelled far from the ordinary to create collaborations that will stay with us forever. This episode will take you back in time to a place where art and poetry complemented the creations of our Dewarists.

Episode 6 - Heer

For the Season four finale Nucleya and Shruti Pathak travel to the land of the beautiful blue waters, Phuket, Thailand, to find a tune for the words of our Poet Dewarist Waris Shah. Shruti Pathak, best known as the voice behind songs like ‘Mar Jawaan’ (Fashion), and‘Subharambh’ (Kai Po Che), has been on tours all over the country promoting her band ‘Guzzler’ and launched ‘Guzzler’ as a radio show. Nucleya redefines Indian electronica by creating a fusion of complex cut up edits and unheard Indian sounds with cutting-edge production and genre-defying rhythms. While they explore the islands, Nucleya comes up with a basic melody and they work further on the track. He is helped by his producer friend, Dub Sharma, to write some lyrics inspired by Heer. Nucleya. They also meet a group of local Thai folk musicians who perform local folk songs that have been sung for years and have been passed on from one generation to another. Nucleya also tries his hand at playing a local Thai instrument, Ranad. The Dewarists discuss the poems of Waris Shah, also popularly known as William Shakespeare of India for his most famous work, Heer Ranjha. Waris Shah's poem is much more than just a love story; it is also about a man's search for, and tenuous relationship with, his creator.

Season Five (2016)

Episode 1 - Yaad Rakh

DEWAR'S brings together two compelling artists for the premiere episode of The Dewarists Season Five. Experience their LIVE TRUE voyage as they talk about their past trials and present experiences that have molded them into who they are today. Benny Dayal, the voice behind Bollywood's best chartbusters, has carved his niche in the industry. His passion is so deeply rooted, it drove him to the heights he is at today. Dayal is as recognizable for his Dewarist spirit as he is for his voice. Naezy, like most rappers, experienced an early life battle within his tough childhood, and rough neighborhood. Rap was what he turned to for an escape. His work lives true to its source, as he covers life stories around him with startling and undisguised realism, making him a passionate Dewarist.

Episode 2 - Ikka Dukka

In episode two of The Dewarists, presented by DEWAR'S, we explore the verdant beauty of Ladakh with Clinton Cerejo, Bianca Gomes and Deepak Ramola. The vast mountains and peaceful monasteries inspire them to write Ikka Dukka, a passionate quest for a higher power. Watch as they translate these LIVE TRUE moments into a song that perfectly blends their passion.

Episode 3 - Dil Beparvah

Ankur Tewari and Prateek Kuhad set off on an inspiring journey to the hills of Shillong in Episode 3. They create a beautiful masterpiece with Dil Beparvah. It is a song about relentlessly following your heart, no matter how the world perceives your dreams. Their commitment and passion for songwriting, singing and storytelling represent the Dewarist spirit perfectly. Watch their LIVE TRUE journey come alive amidst the beautiful mountains of Shillong which finally lead them to The Dewarists Stage at the Bacardi NH7 Weekender.

Episode 4 - Mitho Laage

In episode four, we take you to the magical palaces of Udaipur, where Dhruv Ghanekar and Mame Khan bring their passion for music alive. Divided by cultures and musical backgrounds, these Dewarists unite to tell you their LIVE TRUE tale with Mitho Laage.

Episode 5 - Memories

Immersed in the beauty and serenity of Hampi, Nucleya and Papon converge on a journey steeped in passion. In episode five, they create a sound that is set in the present and inspired by the echoes of the past. Watch their LIVE TRUE journey weave ancient history and soulful music together with electronic beats in Memories.

Episode 6 - Panchiyaa

In the final episode of The Dewarists this season, watch Amit Trivedi and V Selvaganesh sail through the serene seas of Sri Lanka on a journey to LIVE TRUE with Panchiyaa. While exploring the idea of someone who loves being in love, they set out to create something as pure and soulful as the scenic views around them.

See also
 Thomas Dewar
 Music genre
 Music of India
 Hindustani classical music
 Indian musical instruments

References

External links
Official website
About Dewarists on Star world
Youtube Channel
Image Gallery
TV Review

English-language television shows
Television shows set in Mumbai
Indian music television series
Indian reality television series
2011 Indian television series debuts
Indian musical groups
MTV (Indian TV channel) original programming